Donald Thompson (January 15, 1928 – February 26, 2013) was an American fencer. He competed in the team épée event at the 1948 Summer Olympics, but failed to reach the final.

Thompson won the national épée title in 1953. He studied English at the University of Chicago and later headed the department of English at Wilbur Wright College in Chicago. He also established the English for Credit Program in Chicago. Thompson was a long-term member of the Art Institute of Chicago and a big admirer of the Lyric Opera of Chicago.

References

External links
 

1928 births
2013 deaths
American male épée fencers
Olympic fencers of the United States
Fencers at the 1948 Summer Olympics
Sportspeople from Oakland, California